Sight Winner is a Hong Kong based Thoroughbred racehorse.

It is the Most Improved Horse for 2007/08. In the season of 2008-2009, he sprang a 64-1 surprise to claim his greatest triumph for last. Relishing yielding ground conditions, Sight Winner stalked the leader Egyptian Ra before prevailing in the late stages by a short head in the Group One Champions Mile in late-April. Sight Winner also is one of the nominees of Hong Kong Horse of the Year.

Profile
 Sire: Faltaat
 Dam: Kinjinette
 Sex: Gelding
 Country : 
 Colour : Brown
 Owner : Mr & Mrs Tam Wing Kun 
 Trainer : John Size
 Record : (No. of 1-2-3-Starts) 8-6-4-51 (As of 27 February 2012)
 Earnings :  HK$17,284,500 (As of 27 February 2012)

References
 The Hong Kong Jockey Club – Sight Winner Racing Record
 The Hong Kong Jockey Club

Racehorses trained in Hong Kong
Hong Kong racehorses